Eophliantidae is a family of amphipods, containing the following genera:
Bircenna Chilton, 1884
Ceinina Stephensen, 1933
Cylindryllioides Nichols, 1938
Eophliantis Sheard, 1936
Lignophliantis J. L. Barnard, 1969
Wandelia Chevreux, 1906
They have a wide distribution in the world's oceans, and live among algae.

References

External links

Gammaridea
Crustacean families